Parakampylia (Greek: Παρακαμπύλια) is a former municipality in Aetolia-Acarnania, West Greece, Greece. Since the 2011 local government reform it is part of the municipality Agrinio, of which it is a municipal unit. The municipal unit has an area of 231.282 km2. Population 1,943 (2011). The seat of the municipality was in Agios Vlasios.

References

Populated places in Aetolia-Acarnania